Chitkan (Shidkhan) is a rural locality (a selo) and the administrative centre of Chitkanskoye Rural Settlement, Barguzinsky District, Republic of Buryatia, Russia. The population was 957 as of 2017. There are 7 streets.

Geography 
Chitkan is located 28 km southeast of Barguzin (the district's administrative centre) by road. Maloye Uro is the nearest rural locality.

References 

Rural localities in Barguzinsky District